The 2017–18 LigaPro (also known as Ledman LigaPro for sponsorship reasons) was the 28th season of Portuguese football's second-tier league, and the fourth season under the current LigaPro title. A total of 20 teams competed in this division, including reserve sides from top-flight Primeira Liga teams.

Teams
A total of 20 teams contested the league, including 16 sides from the 2016–17 season, two teams relegated from the 2016–17 Primeira Liga and two promoted from the 2016–17 Campeonato de Portugal.

Team changes

Promoted from 2016–17 Campeonato de Portugal
 Oliveirense (North zone promotion group winner)
 Real (South zone promotion group winner)

Relegated from 2016–17 Primeira Liga
 Arouca
 Nacional

Promoted to 2017–18 Primeira Liga
 Portimonense
 Desportivo das Aves

Relegated to 2017–18 Campeonato de Portugal
 Vizela
 Fafe
 Freamunde
 Olhanense

Stadia and locations

Personnel and sponsors

Coaching changes

Season summary

League table

Season statistics

Top goalscorers

Hat-tricks

Note
(H) – Home ; (A) – Away

Top assists

Scoring

First goal of the season: 
 Bilel Aouacheria, for Sporting da Covilhã vs Sporting B (6 August 2017)
Biggest home win: 
Famalicão 6–0 Sporting B (25 November 2017)
Nacional 6–0 Porto B (7 March 2018)
Biggest away win: 
Nacional 0–4 Real (7 October 2017)
Benfica B 1–5 Académico Viseu (11 February 2018)
Benfica B 0–4 Académica (9 March 2018)
União da Madeira 0–4 Benfica B (14 March 2018)
Porto B 0–4 Braga B (29 April 2018)
Highest scoring match: 9 goals
Braga B 5–4 Nacional (1 October 2017)
Biggest winning margin: 6 goals
Famalicão 6–0 Sporting B (25 November 2017)
Nacional 6–0 Porto B (7 March 2018)
Most goals scored in a match by a team: 6 goals
Famalicão 6–0 Sporting B (25 November 2017)
Nacional 6–0 Porto B (7 March 2018)

Awards

Monthly awards

Liga Portugal

Annual awards

Liga Portugal

Player of the Season 
The Player of the Season was awarded to  Ricardo Gomes (Nacional).

Manager of the Season 
The Manager of the Season was awarded to  Costinha (Nacional).

Goalkeeper of the Season 
The Goalkeeper of the Season was awarded to  Ricardo Ribeiro (Académica).

Young Player of the Year 
The Young Player of the Year was awarded to  Artur Abreu (Vitória de Guimarães B).

Club Fair-Play Prize 
The Club Fair-Play Prize was awarded to Benfica B.

Player Fair-Play Prize 
The Player Fair-Play Prize was awarded to  Casillas (Porto).

References 

Liga Portugal 2 seasons
2017–18 in Portuguese football leagues
Portugal